The Greens–European Green Group (LV–GVE) was a Spanish party alliance in the European Parliament election in 2009.

Member parties
The Greens–Green Group (LV–GV)
The Greens–Ecologist Alternative (EV–AE)
European Green Group (GVE)
Greens of the Mediterranean (VM)

References

Defunct political party alliances in Spain
European Green Group